The Alpouro River is a river in Borgou Department, Benin. It drains into the Ouémé River in Ouémé-Supérieur Classified Forest south of Bori.

References

Rivers of Benin
Borgou Department